John Victor Vincent (8 February 1947 – 23 December 2006) was an English professional footballer who played as an attacking midfielder or inside forward. He made nearly 300 appearances and scored 59 goals in the Football League. After a spell in non-League football he finished his playing career in the United States.

Life and career
Vincent was born in West Bromwich, Staffordshire. He joined Birmingham City when he left school, and made his first-team debut in March 1964, shortly after his 17th birthday. His style of play was elegant and he was consistent in his ability to launch an attack, whether by good passing of the ball or by purposeful running. When he became a first team regular, some three years after making his debut, he was creating chances for Barry Bridges, Geoff Vowden and Fred Pickering; later he supplied Jimmy Greenhoff, Bob Latchford and Bob Hatton. He had a powerful shot himself; for Birmingham he scored 44 goals in 194 appearances in all competitions. He remained first choice under Stan Cullis's management, but Cullis's successor Freddie Goodwin traded him for Middlesbrough's more physical George Smith, both players being valued at £40,000. He spent one season at Middlesbrough followed by three years with Cardiff City, before returning to the Midlands with Atherstone Town. He finished his playing career with a season in the NASL with Connecticut Bicentennials.

After football, he spent 13 years in the licensed trade in the West Midlands area. He died of cancer in a Kidderminster, Worcestershire, nursing home at the age of 59.

References
General

Specific

1947 births
2006 deaths
Sportspeople from West Bromwich
English footballers
Association football midfielders
Birmingham City F.C. players
Middlesbrough F.C. players
Cardiff City F.C. players
Atherstone Town F.C. players
Connecticut Bicentennials players
English Football League players
North American Soccer League (1968–1984) players
English expatriate sportspeople in the United States
Expatriate soccer players in the United States
English expatriate footballers